Moujhed Fahid Khalifa (born 1955) is an Iraqi athlete. He competed in the men's triple jump at the 1980 Summer Olympics.

References

1955 births
Living people
Athletes (track and field) at the 1980 Summer Olympics
Iraqi male triple jumpers
Olympic athletes of Iraq
Place of birth missing (living people)
Athletes (track and field) at the 1974 Asian Games
Asian Games competitors for Iraq